The Maremma (from Latin , "maritime [land]") is a coastal area of western central Italy, bordering the Tyrrhenian Sea. It includes much of south-western Tuscany and part of northern Lazio. It was formerly mostly marshland, often malarial, but was drained by order of Ferdinando I de' Medici.

It was traditionally populated by the butteri, mounted cattle herders who rode horses fitted with one of two distinctive styles of saddle, the scafarda and the bardella.

Geography 

Animal breeds 
The Maremma has given rise to, or given its name to, several breeds of domestic animal. These include two breeds of working horse, the Maremmano and the Cavallo Romano della Maremma Laziale, formerly used by butteri and cavalcanti; the Maremmana breed of large grey cattle; the Maremmano breed of shepherd's guard-dog; and the Macchiaiola Maremmana breed of small pig, so named because it was kept extensively, left to roam in the woodland.

References

 
 

Geographical, historical and cultural regions of Italy
Geography of Lazio
Geography of Tuscany
Grosseto
Viterbo